Justice Bingham may refer to:

Edward Franklin Bingham (1828–1907), chief justice of the Supreme Court of the District of Columbia
Tom Bingham, Baron Bingham of Cornhill (1933–2010), Lord Chief Justice of England and Wales

See also
Judge Bingham (disambiguation)